Bishal Bhattarai (born April 4, 1969) in Khotang, Nepal is a Nepalese Politician and serving as the Chief Whip of Nepal Communist Party(UML). He is the Member Of House Of Representatives (Nepal) elected from Khotang. He is also the member of Nepal Communist Party.
He won The election for the Constituent Assembly in 2065 BS for the first time from Khotang-2.

References

1969 births
Living people
Nepal MPs 2017–2022
Nepal Communist Party (NCP) politicians
People from Khotang District
Members of the 2nd Nepalese Constituent Assembly
Communist Party of Nepal (Unified Marxist–Leninist) politicians